Rémalard is a former commune in the Orne department in north-western France. On 1 January 2016, it was merged into the new commune of Rémalard en Perche.

It is located close to the river Huisne, in the Perche regional park. It is surrounded by the cities of Alencon (60 km to the west), Dreux (65 km to the north east), Chartres (60 km to the east) and Le Mans (72 km to the south west).

See also
Communes of the Orne department

References

Former communes of Orne